A Tribal Political Organization is a political tribal council advocating the political interests of the First Nations and Tribes of their constituency.  This list focuses on the TPOs to which the various Anishinaabe nations belong.

List of Anishinaabe tribal political organizations 

 Assembly of Manitoba Chiefs
 Southern Chiefs' Organization
 Chiefs of Ontario
 Grand Council of Treaty 3
 Grand Council of Treaty 8
 Great Lakes Inter-tribal Council
 Bad River Band of Lake Superior Chippewa
 Forest County Potawatomi
 Ho-Chunk Nation
 Lac Courte Oreilles Band of Lake Superior Chippewa
 Lac du Flambeau Band of Lake Superior Chippewa
 Lac Vieux Desert Tribe of Michigan
 Menominee Tribe of Wisconsin
 Oneida Nation
 Red Cliff Band of Lake Superior Chippewa
 Sokaogon Chippewa (Mole Lake)
 St. Croix Chippewa Indians of Wisconsin
 Stockbridge-Munsee Indians of Wisconsin
 Inter-tribal Council of Michigan
 Bay Mills Indian Community
 Grand Traverse Band of Ottawa and Chippewa Indians
 Hannahville Indian Community
 Keweenaw Bay Indian Community
 Lac Vieux Desert Band of Lake Superior Chippewa
 Little Traverse Bay Bands of Odawa Indians
 Match-E-Be-Nash-She-Wish Band of Pottawatomi
 Nottawaseppi Huron Band of Potawatomi
 Pokagon Band of Potawatomi
 Saginaw Chippewa Tribal Council
 Sault Tribe of Chippewa Indians
 Minnesota Indian Affairs Council
 Lower Sioux Indian Community
 Minnesota Chippewa Tribe
 Prairie Island Indian Community
 Red Lake Band of Chippewa
 Shakopee Mdewakanton Sioux Community
 Upper Sioux Community (Pejuhutazizi Oyate)
 Nishnawbe Aski Nation (formerly known as Grand Council Treaty 9)
 Flying Post First Nation
 Independent First Nations Alliance
 Keewaytinook Okimakanak Council
 Matawa First Nations
 Mishkeegogamang First Nation
 Mocreebec Council of the Cree Nation
 Mushkegowuk Council
 Sandy Lake First Nation
 Shibogama First Nations Council
 Southern Chiefs' Organization
 Wabun Tribal Council
 Weenusk First Nation
 Wabun Tribal Council
 Windigo First Nations Council
 Union of Ontario Indians

Tribal Treaty Administrants 
In Canada, Tribal Political Organization takes the role of the Tribal Treaty Administrant.  However, in the United States, the function of Tribal Treaty Administrant is separate from that of the Tribal Political Organization.

 1854 Treaty Authority (formerly, the Tri-Band Authority) - 1842CT Grand Portage fisheries, 1854CT, 1866CT Bois Forte cultural resources
 Chippewa Ottawa Resource Authority - 1836CT fisheries
 Grand Council of Treaty 3 - Treaty 3
 Grand Council of Treaty 8 - Treaty 8
 Great Lakes Indian Fish & Wildlife Commission - 1837CT, 1836CT, 1842CT and 1854CT
 Nishnawbe Aski Nation - Treaty 5 and Treaty 9
 Red Lake Band of Chippewa - 1886CT and 1889CT
 Union of Ontario Indians - RS, RH1, RH2, misc. pre-confederation treaties

References 

 
Political advocacy groups in Canada
Political advocacy groups in the United States
Anishinaabe tribal treaty administrants
Potawatomi
Native American organizations